A referendum concerning the closing hour for licensed premises and registered clubs was put to voters on 10 June 1916. The referendum was conducted on the basis of optional preferential voting. Preferences were not counted as a majority voted for 6:00 pm closing time.

Background

The question
The voting paper was:
Indicate your vote by placing the figure 1 in the square opposite the closing hour for which you vote in the first instance, and as your first preference. 

You may, in addition, indicate in the order of your preference which of the other closing hours you prefer (in the event of the hour for which you first vote not getting a majority) by placing the figures 2, 3, 4, 5, 6, or any of such figures, in the squares opposite the other closing hours, thereby indicating the order of your preference. 

It is not necessary to vote for more than one closing hour, but the hour for which you first vote must have against it the figure 1. 

The vote for any preference after the first will only be counted in the event of there not being a majority of votes in favour of any of your prior preferences.

Results
The referendum was overwhelmingly in favour of 6:00 pm closing time.

Aftermath
Although it was introduced as a temporary measure, the government brought in extensions and discussed putting the matter to a referendum. In 1923, however, without testing the matter by a popular vote, the Fuller Nationalist government enacted 6 pm as the closing time.

This was the first of three referendums concerning the closing hour for licensed premises and clubs.

See also 
 Referendums in New South Wales

References

1916 referendums
Referendums in New South Wales
December 1916 events
1910s in New South Wales
Alcohol law
Alcohol in Australia